Artjom Savitski (born 27 January 1992) is an Estonian singer and audio technician.

He was born in Tallinn. He has graduated from Tallinn University of Technology in telecommunications speciality. He is working at Jüri Pihel's studio as an audio technician.

In 2011, he achieved second place in the television program Eesti otsib superstaari.

Discography

 single "Kõnnime seda teed" (with Liis Lemsalu; 2011)
 single "Ainus soov" (2011)
 single "Lõputu" (2013)
 album "Valin ise oma tee" (2015)

References

Living people
1992 births
21st-century Estonian male singers
Estonian pop singers
Tallinn University of Technology alumni
Singers from Tallinn